Burleigh Bombers Australian Rules Football Club, also known as the Burleigh Bombers, is an Australian rules football club representing the suburb of Burleigh on the Gold Coast.  The club currently competes in the highest AFL Queensland league, Division One of the AFL Queensland State League and its home ground is Bill Godfrey Oval.

Premierships (3)

Notes

References

External links
 Official site

Burleigh
Burleigh Heads, Queensland
Australian rules football teams on the Gold Coast, Queensland